This is a list of the tallest buildings in Portugal. Since 1998 the tallest building in Portugal has been the  Torre Vasco da Gama in Lisbon.

Tallest completed buildings

Proposed buildings

References